Sociological naturalism is a theory that states that the natural world and social world are roughly identical and governed by similar principles. Sociological naturalism, in sociological texts simply referred to as naturalism, can be traced back to the philosophical thinking of Auguste Comte in the 19th century, closely connected to positivism, which advocates use of the scientific method of the natural sciences in studying social sciences. It should not be identified too closely with Positivism, however, since whilst the latter advocates the use of controlled situations like experiments as sources of scientific information, naturalism insists that social processes should only be studied in their natural setting.  A similar form of naturalism was applied to the scientific study of art and literature by Hippolyte Taine (see Race, milieu, and moment).

Contemporary sociologists do not generally dispute that social phenomena take place within the natural universe and, as such, are subject to natural constraints, such as the laws of physics.  Up for debate is the nature of the distinctiveness of social phenomena as a subset of natural phenomena. Broad support exists for the antipositivist claim that crucial qualitative differences mean that one cannot explain social phenomena effectively using investigative tools or even standards of validity derived from other natural sciences. From this point of view, naturalism does not imply scientism.  

However, a classically positivist conflation of naturalism with scientism has not disappeared; this view is still dominant in some old and prestigious schools, such as the sociology departments at the University of Chicago in the United States, and McGill University in Montréal, Canada.

More recently, actor-network theory has analyzed the social construction of the nature/society distinction itself.

See also 

 Antipositivism
 Creator deity
 Emergence
 Environmental social science
 Natural order (philosophy)
 Organicism
 Permaculture
 Philosophical naturalism
 Sociobiology
 Traditionalist conservatism

Sociological theories
Naturalism (philosophy)